The 1982 National Challenge Cup was the 69th edition of the USSF's annual open soccer championship. Teams from the North American Soccer League declined to participate. The New York Pancyprian-Freedoms defeated Maccabee A.C. in the final game in extra time by a score of 4–3.

References

External links
 1982 National Challenge Cup – TheCup.us

Lamar Hunt U.S. Open Cup
U.S. Open Cup